Stephanie Sol (born January 22, 1990) is a Filipina actress. She is known for her roles as Abby Reyes-Luna in The Rich Man's Daughter and Belle Acosta in More Than Words. She is currently under contract with GMA Artist Center of GMA.

Life and career
Stephanie Sol was born in 1990 in Cagayan de Oro, Philippines, and studied at the University of Asia and the Pacific.

She began her career as a television commercial model, and has since been cast in a number of GMA Network TV series, including Meant To Be, the TV series that made her rise to fame, The Rich Man's Daughter, Alyas Robin Hood, and notably in Sinungaling Mong Puso.

Filmography

Television

References

External links
Stephanie Sol at GMANetwork.com

1990 births
Living people
Filipino television actresses
Actresses from Misamis Oriental
People from Cagayan de Oro
Visayan people
GMA Network personalities
Women television personalities